Enquiry may refer to:
Inquiry (process)
Enquiry agent or Private investigator
Enquiry based learning
Enquiry into Plants or Historia Plantarum, name of books by Theophrastus, Gessner and Ray
The Enquiry character
Enquiry (film)

See also
Inquiry (disambiguation)
Enquiry Concerning Political Justice, by Godwin
An Enquiry Concerning Human Understanding, by Hume
An Enquiry Concerning the Principles of Morals, by Hume
Enquiry into the Cost of the National Health Service or Guillebaud Report, by Guillebaud for the UK Parliament